An eyeball planet is a hypothetical type of tidally locked planet, for which tidal locking induces spatial features (for example in the geography or composition of the planet) resembling an eyeball. They are terrestrial planets where liquids may be present, in which tidal locking will induce a spatially dependent temperature gradient (the planet will be hotter on the side facing the star and colder on the other side). This temperature gradient may therefore limit the places in which liquid may exist on the surface of the planet to ring-or disk-shaped areas.

Such planets are further divided into "hot" and "cold" eyeball planets, depending on which side of the planet the liquid is present. A "hot" eyeball planet is usually closer to its host star, and the centre of the "eye", facing the star (day side), is made of rock while liquid is present on the opposite side (night side). A "cold" eyeball planet, usually farther from the star, will have liquid on the side facing the host star while the rest of its surface is made of ice and rocks.

Because most planetary bodies have a natural tendency toward becoming tidally locked to their host body on a long enough timeline, it is thought that eyeball planets may be common and could host life, particularly in planetary systems orbiting red and brown dwarf stars which have lifespans much longer than other main sequence stars.

Potential candidates 

Kepler-1652b is potentially an eyeball planet. The TRAPPIST-1 system may contain several such planets.

References 

Tidal forces
Hypothetical planet types